Limuchi (also Romanized as Līmūchī; also known as Līmūchīhā) is a village in Pian Rural District, in the Central District of Izeh County, Khuzestan Province, Iran. At the 2006 census, its population was 79, in 15 families.

References 

Populated places in Izeh County